ClariNet Communications Corp was an online newspaper service delivered over the internet. It was founded in 1989 in Waterloo, Ontario by Brad Templeton.

ClariNet delivered traditional newspaper and magazine content using Usenet newsgroup technology,
existing as a proprietary newsgroup hierarchy independent to the Big 8 hierarchies.
News was delivered over the internet using NNTP as well as UUCP.

Founding 

In the late 1980s, the Internet in the United States consisted of a variety of regional hubs
connected by the NSFNet.  Overtly commercial traffic was not permitted due to the
Acceptable Use Policy.  Templeton reports convincing
Stephen Wolff, director of NSFNet, that a news service sold to universities and research labs
on the internet for use in research and education would not violate the AUP, even though it was
a for-profit effort.

It has some claim to being the earliest company created to use the internet as a business platform, commonly known as a dot-com company.

The initial announcement of a for-profit internet-based business was announced in June 1989
 and
generated significant controversy
with some expressing fear of a destruction of the non-profit culture of the network.
The first subscribing customer was Stanford University.

Business 

ClariNet began publishing the news of UPI and Newsbytes and other typical newspaper wire sources.
It also included material form newspaper syndicates, such as the popular Dave Barry column and
the first internet based comic strips, including Dilbert by Scott Adams.
The 'Street Price Report' published a database of advertised prices for computer products in
magazines, presaging the creation of Comparison shopping websites later in the decade.

In 1994 ClariNet switched from UPI to the Associated Press and Reuters.
Other services added included the Commerce Business Daily, PR Newswire and Business Wire

ClariNet grew quickly for the pre-dot-com-boom era, and was the highest ranked dot-com company
on the 1996 Inc. Magazine 500.

ClariNet sold site-wide subscriptions.  At the time of its acquisition by Individual, Inc.
in 1997 it reported 1.5 million paying subscribers.

Free speech 

ClariNet was a plaintiff/appellant in the United States Supreme Court
case Reno v. American Civil Liberties Union.  ClariNet's CEO testified that the
Communications Decency Act created a chilling effect for online publishers.  The appellants
prevailed 9-0 and the decency sections were struck down.

Science Fiction eBooks 

In 1992 ClariNet announced a subscription "all you can read" book service for Science Fiction readers
called the "Library of Tomorrow."  In 1993,
it published, in coordination with the Science Fiction Hugo Awards an E-book anthology
containing all the nominees for the 1993 Hugo Award, presented at the
51st World Science Fiction Convention in San Francisco.   The anthology also contained all
Nebula Award short fiction nominees for that year.  With 5 full novels (most still only available
in hardcover) ClariNet claimed this was the largest anthology or e-Book of current fiction published
under one cover.  It also featured a hypertext version of A Fire Upon the Deep, the to-be-Hugo-winning
novel by Vernor Vinge.
The anthology was available for download over the internet, and on CD-ROM.  In particular,
it was made available to voters in the Hugo awards to allow them to read the works in time to vote on
them for the award.  The publication of such a "Hugo Packet" became a common practice in later years.

Alumni 
 Brad Templeton
 Don Woods (programmer)
 David H. Brandin

See also 
 History of the Internet
 dot-com company
 USENET
 UUNET

References

External links
  - Remnant page
  - Product page for Hugo anthology
  - Account by Templeton of how the rec.humor.funny newsgroup led to the creation of ClariNet
  - USENET history

Internet properties established in 1989
Canadian news websites
1989 establishments in Ontario
Newspaper companies of Canada
Companies based in Waterloo, Ontario